Friedeburgerhütte is a village and a former municipality in the Mansfeld-Südharz district, Saxony-Anhalt, Germany. Since 1 January 2010, it is part of the town Gerbstedt.

On August 6, 2010 the village celebrated the 270th anniversary of its foundation.

Former municipalities in Saxony-Anhalt
Gerbstedt